Third sector may refer to:

Voluntary sector, the economic sector consisting of non-governmental organizations and other non-profit organizations
Public–private partnership, a company jointly owned by government and private interests
Third Sector (magazine), a British magazine

See also
Sector 3 (disambiguation)
Tertiary sector of the economy